Asmaa Adnan Mohamed Salman al-Dulaimi is an Iraqi politician and a member of parliament for the Iraqi Accord Front.

Asmaa al-Dulami taught Islamic Studies at a university in Baghdad before entering politics. She was elected to the Council of Representatives of Iraq in the Iraqi legislative election of December 2005, when the Iraqi Accord Front, a coalition of three parties including her own - the General Council for the People of Iraq, a party led by her father, Adnan al-Dulaimi - won 44 seats.

References

Members of the Council of Representatives of Iraq
Living people
21st-century Iraqi women politicians
21st-century Iraqi politicians
Iraqi Accord Front politicians
Year of birth missing (living people)